Maxima may refer to:

People 
 Maxima of Rome, early Christian saint and martyr
 Maxima of Lisbon, early Christian saint and martyr
 Queen Máxima of the Netherlands (born 1971)
 Máxima Acuña, Peruvian activist
 Maximilla, also known as Maxima, early Montanist figure

Science and mathematics 
 Maxima and minima, the highest and lowest values of a function in calculus
 Maxima (software), a free open-source computer algebra system
 Millimeter Anisotropy eXperiment IMaging Array, a cosmic microwave background experiment

Vehicles 
 Voith Maxima, a locomotive family built by Voith Turbo
 Nissan Maxima, an automobile manufactured by Nissan

Other uses 
 Maxima (music), a musical note value in mensural notation
 Máxima (magazine), a Portuguese magazine
 Maxima, an Austrian magazine owned by BIPA, a health and beauty chain owned by REWE Group
 Maxima (DC Comics), a character in the DC comics universe
 Maxima (The King of Fighters), a character in The King of Fighters
 Maxima Group, a retail chain in Lithuania, Latvia, Estonia, Bulgaria and Poland

See also
 Macsyma, an early symbolic mathematical system developed at MIT
 Maxim (disambiguation)
 Maxime (disambiguation)
 Maximón, a folk saint venerated in various forms by Maya people of several towns in the highlands of Western Guatemala.
 Maximum (disambiguation)
 Maximus (disambiguation)